Bolesławów  is a village (former town) in the administrative district of Gmina Stronie Śląskie, within Kłodzko County, Lower Silesian Voivodeship, in south-western Poland. It is located within the historic Kłodzko Land.

The village has a population of 250.

History
It is a former town. It was granted town rights in 1581 and was deprived of them in 1894. In the 16th century the town became the center of a metal mining and industrial region. In the 17th century it became part of an estate, centered in Stronie Śląskie, which from 1838 was owned by Princess Marianne of the Netherlands. In the 18th century it was annexed by Prussia and from 1871 to 1945 it was part of Germany, and after the defeat of Nazi Germany in World War II it passed to Poland.

Sights
Among the historic sights of Bolesławów are the Baroque church of St. Joseph and the statues of Catholic saints Francis Xavier and John of Nepomuk.

Gallery

Notable residents
 Wolfgang Vogel (1925–2008), German lawyer

References

Villages in Kłodzko County
Former populated places in Lower Silesian Voivodeship